The 34th running of the Tour of Flanders cycling classic was held on Sunday, 2 April 1950. Italian Fiorenzo Magni won the race with a two-minute lead over Briek Schotte. Frenchman Louis Caput was third at more than nine minutes. It was Magni's second consecutive victory in the Tour of Flanders. 21 of 220 riders finished.

Route
The race started in Ghent and finished in Wetteren – totaling 275 km. The course featured five categorized climbs:

Results

References

Tour of Flanders
Tour of Flanders
Tour of Flanders
Tour of Flanders
Tour of Flanders